Bonneuil-en-France (literally Bonneuil in France) is a commune in the Val-d'Oise department in Île-de-France in northern France.

Le Bourget Airport is partially located in the commune.

Geography

Climate

Bonneuil-en-France has a oceanic climate (Köppen climate classification Cfb).

Education
The commune has one combined preschool (école maternelle) and elementary school.  it has 82 students. Junior high school students in the commune attend Collège Jean Moulin in Arnouville-lès-Gonesse. The area senior high school is Lycée René Cassin in Gonesse.

See also
Communes of the Val-d'Oise department

References

External links
Home page 
Association of Mayors of the Val d'Oise 

Communes of Val-d'Oise